Maya: The Lost Mother is a 2019 Bangladeshi war drama film. The film written and directed by Masud Pathik and produced by Information Ministry of Bangladesh Government. It feature Mumtaz Sorcar, Pran Roy, Jyotika Jyoti and Debashish Kaiser in lead roles. The film released on December 27, 2019. The film also premiered on 18th Dhaka International Film Festival.

Cast 
 Devasish Kaiser 
 Mumtaz Sorcar
 Jyotika Jyoti
 Pran Roy
 Nargis Aktar
 Syed Hasan Imam
 Lina Ferdousi
 Jhuna Chowdhury
 Aslam Sunny
 Dr. Shahadat Hossain Nipu

Marketing and Release 
The official trailer of the film was released on November 20, 2019. The film was released in 5 theatres on December 27, 2019.

Awards
The film won 44th Bangladesh National Film Awards - 2019 in a maximum of eight categories.

References 

2019 films
Bengali-language Bangladeshi films
2010s Bengali-language films
Government of Bangladesh grants films